The Jackson, Tennessee Metropolitan Statistical Area, as defined by the United States Census Bureau, is an area consisting of two counties - Madison and Chester - in western Tennessee, anchored by the city of Jackson.  As of the 2010 census, the MSA had a population of 115,425.

Counties
Chester
Madison

Communities
Deanburg (unincorporated)
Enville
Henderson
Humboldt (partial)
Jacks Creek (unincorporated)
Jackson (Principal city)
Medon
Milledgeville (partial)
Pinson (unincorporated)
Silerton (partial)
Three Way

Crime 
According to Morgan Quitno's 2010 Metropolitan Crime Rate Rankings  the Jackson metropolitan area had the 13th highest crime rate in the United States.

The Morgan Quitno list of the "Top 25 Most Dangerous Cities of 2007", ranked Jackson's as the 9th most dangerous metropolitan area in the United States. In 2006, it had been listed as the 18th most dangerous.

Demographics
As of the census of 2000, there were 107,377 people, 41,212 households, and 28,836 families residing within the MSA. The racial makeup of the MSA was 68.52% White, 29.21% African American, 0.17% Native American, 0.57% Asian, 0.01% Pacific Islander, 0.62% from other races, and 0.89% from two or more races. Hispanic or Latino of any race were 1.51% of the population.

The median income for a household in the MSA was $35,666, and the median income for a family was $42,861. Males had a median income of $33,066 versus $22,672 for females. The per capita income for the MSA was $17,573.

Combined Statistical Area
The Jackson-Humboldt Combined Statistical Area is made up of three counties in west Tennessee. The statistical area includes the Jackson Metropolitan Statistical Area and the Humboldt Micropolitan Statistical Area.

See also
Tennessee census statistical areas
List of cities and towns in Tennessee

References

 
Geography of Madison County, Tennessee
Geography of Chester County, Tennessee
West Tennessee